Paledan is a village in Myinmu Township in the southeast of the Sagaing Division in Burma.  It is located just east of Myinmu on the northern bank of the Irrawaddy River.

References

Populated places in Sagaing District